Soyuz MS-21 was a Russian Soyuz spaceflight to the International Space Station (ISS) with a crew of three  launched from Baikonur on 18 March 2022. The launch was previously planned for 30 March 2022, but in the provisional flight manifest prepared by Roscosmos by the end of Summer 2020, the launch of Soyuz MS-21 was advanced to 18 March 2022.

It was the first mission to the ISS with three Roscosmos cosmonauts.

On 29 September 2022, after , the mission completed successfully as planned with a landing on the Kazakh Steppe in Kazakhstan.

Crew 
The three-Russian member crew were named in May 2021. Although NASA had not decided whether or not they would purchase a seat on the flight, NASA astronaut Loral O'Hara was preparing to replace Sergey Korsakov if the agency decided to buy a seat. Later, NASA decided not to acquire a seat on the Soyuz MS-21 launching in March 2022, deferring a NASA Roscosmos seat swap for Soyuz MS-22 and SpaceX Crew-5.

Backup crew

Arrival suits 
The arriving cosmonauts at the station have gained particular international attention after entering in bright yellow suits with blue elements, having changed before and after into different suits. International commentators saw in these colours the national colours of Ukraine and interpreted the personal choice of suits by the cosmonauts as a sign of their sympathy for Ukraine in the light of the parallel ongoing 2022 Russian invasion of Ukraine, which strained also space cooperation such as the ISS program after international sanctions on Russia. The cosmonauts said when asked about the colours that the yellow suits needed to be used, and Roscosmos followed with a statement that the colours are to be read as the identifying colours of the Bauman Moscow State Technical University, from which all three cosmonauts graduated.

References 

Crewed Soyuz missions
Spacecraft launched in 2022
Spacecraft which reentered in 2022
2022 in Russia
March 2022 events in Russia
Fully civilian crewed orbital spaceflights
Sergei Korolev